Ellis Wright (July 1873 − 1940) was an English footballer playing at the turn of the 19th century. He played as a left half in the Football League for Doncaster Rovers.

Playing career
Born as the son of a "table fork grinder", in Shiregreen, Sheffield in July 1873, Wright is first known to have played for his local club Ecclesfield before he moving to Midland League side Doncaster Rovers in 1895. He spent ten seasons at Doncaster, including winning the Midland twice, and playing in the Football League Second Division between 1901 and 1903 and in his final season with the club in 1904−05. Wright appeared 80 times for Doncaster over the three seasons in the Football League, with his total goal scoring amounting to one goal in the Midland League and two in the Yorkshire League.

Personal life
In Sheffield in 1900, Wright married Amabel Gothard. He died in the city in 1940, aged 67.

Honours
Doncaster Rovers
 Midland League
Champions: 1896−97, 1898−99
Runners up: 1900−01
 Yorkshire League
Runners up: 1898−99

Notes
 Football League appearances only

References

1873 births
1940 deaths
Footballers from Sheffield
English footballers
Association football wing halves
Ecclesfield F.C. players
Doncaster Rovers F.C. players
English Football League players
Midland Football League players